The Fates are a common motif in European polytheism, most frequently represented as a trio of goddesses. The Fates shape the destiny of each human, often expressed in textile metaphors such as spinning fibers into yarn, or weaving threads on a loom. This trio is composed of sisters who go by the names Clotho, Lachesis, and Atropos (also known as the daughters of Zeus and Themis). These divine figures are often artistically depicted as beautiful maidens with consideration to their serious responsibility: the life of mortals. Poets typically express the Fates as ugly and unwavering, representing the gravity of their role within the mythological and human worlds.

Individual roles 
The Moirai, meaning "allotted portion" or "share", separated each sister into a different role in order to handle the fates of humans. The Fates were expected to appear within three days of a mortal's birth. Clotho was the first of the three, known as "the spinner", due to the fact that she would weave the threads of human life while in the womb. This act is used to represent her divine duty, also incorporating pregnancies or birth when referring to her. The second Fate, Lachesis, is known as "the Allotter," given the fact that her responsibility includes determining how much mortal life is assigned to the souls of each individual. This, in turn, determines the number of tribulations that individual is predestined to face. The final Fate, Atropos, is known as the most stubborn sister of the three, coined the nickname "the un-turnable". Completing the cycle, Atropos is expected to cut off the thread of life, determining when a human will die. She is typically seen hand in hand with death and the Underworld. Once Atropos cuts the thread, each soul is sent to the Underworld where they receive judgement and are sent to one of three options: Elysium, the Fields of Punishment, or the Fields of Asphodel.

Elysium is labeled a land for the blessed, whereas those who committed horrible deeds were sent to the Fields of Punishment. For the mortals who lived neither an objectively good or bad life were sent to the Fields of Asphodel.

In mythology
The Fates have appeared in numerous cultures with similar tales. In Greek mythology, they appear as incarnations of destiny named the Moirai. The Roman counterparts of the Moirai are known as the Parcae. This trio also makes a name in Slavic culture as the Rozhanitsy, figures who foretell an individual's destiny. Similar to Greek mythology, the Fates are known as incarnations of destiny called Norns in Norse mythology. The biggest variant within these cultures remains in Baltic mythology, which characterizes the Deivės Valdytojos as seven sisters who weave pieces of clothing from the lives of humans.

Indo European Origin 

The Fates are three Proto-Indo-European fate goddesses. Their names have not been reconstructed, but such a group is highly attested in descendant groups. Such goddesses spun the destinies of mankind.

Although such fate goddesses are not directly attested in the Indo-Aryan tradition, the Atharvaveda does contain an allusion comparing fate to a warp. Furthermore, the three Fates appear in nearly every other Indo-European mythology. The earliest attested set of fate goddesses are the Gulses in Hittite mythology, who were said to preside over the individual destinies of human beings. They often appear in mythical narratives alongside the goddesses Papaya and Istustaya, who, in a ritual text for the foundation of a new temple, are described sitting holding mirrors and spindles, spinning the king's thread of life. In the Greek tradition, the Moirai ("Apportioners") are mentioned dispensing destiny in both the Iliad and the Odyssey, in which they are given the epithet Κλῶθες (Klothes, meaning "Spinners").

In Hesiod's Theogony, the Moirai are said to "give mortal men both good and ill" and their names are listed as Klotho("Spinner"), Lachesis ("Apportioner"), and Atropos ("Inflexible"). In his Republic, Plato records that Klotho sings of the past, Lachesis of the present, and Atropos of the future. In Roman legend, the Parcae were three goddesses who presided over the births of children and whose names were Nona ("Ninth"), Decuma ("Tenth"), and Morta ("Death"). They too were said to spin destinies, although this may have been due to influence from Greek literature.

In the Old Norse Völuspá and Gylfaginning, the Norns are three cosmic goddesses of fate who are described sitting by the well of Urðr at the foot of the world tree Yggdrasil. In Old Norse texts, the Norns are frequently conflated with Valkyries, who are sometimes also described as spinning. Old English texts, such as Rhyme Poem 70, and Guthlac 1350 f., reference Wyrd as a singular power that "weaves" destinies.

Later texts mention the Wyrds as a group, with Geoffrey Chaucer referring to them as "the Werdys that we clepyn Destiné" in The Legend of Good Women. A goddess spinning appears in a bracteate from southwest Germany and a relief from Trier shows three mother goddesses, with two of them holding distaffs. Tenth-century German ecclesiastical writings denounce the popular belief in three sisters who determined the course of a man's life at his birth. An Old Irish hymn attests to seven goddesses who were believed to weave the thread of destiny, which demonstrates that these spinster fate-goddesses were present in Celtic mythology as well.

A Lithuanian folktale recorded in 1839 recounts that a man's fate is spun at his birth by seven goddesses known as the deivės valdytojos and used to hang a star in the sky; when he dies, his thread snaps and his star falls as a meteor. In Latvian folk songs, a goddess called the Láima is described as weaving a child's fate at its birth. Although she is usually only one goddess, the Láima sometimes appears as three. The three spinning fate goddesses appear in Slavic traditions in the forms of the Russian Rožanicy, the Czech and Slovak Sudičky, the Bulgarian Narenčnice or Urisnice, the Polish Rodzanice, the Croatian Rodjenice, the Serbian Sudjenice, and the Slovene Rojenice. Albanian folk tales speak of the Fatit, three old women who appear three days after a child is born and determine its fate, using language reminiscent of spinning.

In the visual arts 

Considering the roles of each divine sister, Clotho is typically portrayed as a younger woman because of her relationship with the birth of humans, whereas Atropos is pictured as an old woman because of her hand in the death of mortals. Each sister has been pictured with a tangible representation of their power: Clotho with thread, Lachesis with an eye glass, and Atropos with scissors. The Fates make a specific appearance within the artwork of Francisco de Goya's black paintings. These were a series of 14 pieces completed by the artist nearing the later stages of his life. Their dark tone, literally and figuratively, capture the Fates holding an individual hostage as they are deciding his destiny. More recently, Anne-Katrin Altwein depicted the divine sisters through sculptures that originally resided in the entrance of a German hospital as a means of creative inspiration to patients. Altwein sculpted Clotho as a pregnant woman as opposed to simply holding the thread of life in order to present her in a more positive light. The sculptures have since been moved to the city center of Jena, also home to the same hospital.

In fiction
This motif has been replicated in fictional accounts, such as:

Three Witches, characters in Shakespeare's Macbeth
In his poem "Howl", Allen Ginsberg warns of "the three old shrews of fate the one eyed shrew of the heterosexual dollar the one eyed shrew that winks out of the womb and the one eyed shrew that does nothing but sit on her ass and snip the intellectual golden threads of the craftsman's loom".
Orddu, Orwen and Orgoch, characters in Lloyd Alexander's 1960s book series The Chronicles of Prydain.
The Fates, characters in Disney's Hercules
The Kindly Ones, characters in “The Sandman” series of comics written by Neil Gaiman
The Fates/Moirai, characters in various books by Rick Riordan in the Percy Jackson and the Olympians, Heroes of Olympus and The Trials of Apollo series
Both the Moirai, under the name "Sisters of Fate", and the Norns appear in the God of War video game series; the Sisters of Fate appear as antagonists in the Greek-based game God of War II (2007) while the Norns appear as minor characters in the Norse-based game, God of War Ragnarök (2022).
The Fates, characters in Anaïs Mitchell's Hadestown musical
The Fates, primary antagonists of season five of the superhero television series Legends of Tomorrow
The three aspects of Fate in With a Tangled Skein by Piers Anthony

See Also 

 Triple goddess

Notes

References

Bibliography 

Time and fate goddesses
Triple goddesses
Destiny
Textiles in folklore
Proto-Indo-European deities
Proto-Indo-European mythology